Chae Son National Park is a national park in Lampang Province, Thailand. Home to the namesake Chae Son waterfall, the park is also host to caves and hot springs.

Geography
The park's area is 480,000 rai ~ . Park mountains form part of the Khun Tan Range and are an important water source for the surrounding area.

History
Originally a Forest Park, on 28 July 1988 Chae Son was designated Thailand's 58th National Park.

Attractions
The park's main attraction is Chae Son Waterfall, a six-tiered waterfall  in height. Mae Peak is a three-tiered waterfall  in height. Other waterfalls include Mae Koon, also , and Mae Mawn.

The park also has numerous cave systems including Pha-ngam, Mor, Luang and Loug Kae.

Flora and fauna
The park's forests are mixed deciduous and deciduous dipterocarp. Tree species include Afzelia xylocarpa, Chukrasia velutina, Toona ciliata, Diospyros, Lagerstroemia calyculata, Dipterocarpus alatus, Dipterocarpus obtusifolius, Pinus merkusii, Pinus kesiya, Pterocarpus macrocarpus, Shorea obtusa and Shorea siamensis.

Animals in the park include Phayre's leaf monkey, sambar deer, Asian golden cat, Southwest China serow, northern red muntjac (Muntiacus muntjak vaginalis), chevrotain, Siamese hare, Sunda flying lemur, Malayan porcupine, Finlayson's squirrel, wild boar and northern treeshrew.

Bird life in Chae Son includes white-rumped shama, red junglefowl, woodpecker, bulbul, barbet, tailorbird, green pigeon, warbler, babbler and dove.

See also
List of national parks of Thailand
List of Protected Areas Regional Offices of Thailand

References

National parks of Thailand
Geography of Lampang province
Tourist attractions in Lampang province
1988 establishments in Thailand
Protected areas established in 1988